There are 99 counties in the U.S. state of Iowa. The first two counties, Des Moines County and Dubuque County, were created in 1834 when Iowa was still part of the Michigan Territory. In preparation for Michigan's statehood, part of Michigan Territory was formed into Wisconsin Territory in 1836. Two years later, the western portion was split off to become Iowa Territory. The south-eastern part of Iowa Territory became Iowa, the 29th state in the union, on 28 December 1846, by which point 44 counties had been created. Counties continued to be created by the state government until 1857, when the last county, Humboldt County, was created. One of the most significant days in Iowa county history was January 15, 1851, on which 49 counties were created.

The Iowa Constitution of 1857, which is still in effect today, states that counties must have an area of at least , and no county may be reduced below that size by boundary changes. However, exceptions to this rule were granted, as ten counties have areas below this size. (The table below shows land area, but the Constitution deals with total area.) Polk County contains the state's capital and largest city, Des Moines. In addition, Iowa has one of the smallest percentages of counties whose boundaries are dictated by natural means, the vast majority of which are being formed by lines of survey instead, resulting in many "box counties".

County information
The Federal Information Processing Standard (FIPS) code, used by the United States government to uniquely identify counties, is provided with each entry. The FIPS code for each county links to census data for that county.
The column labeled '#' is the official county number when listed alphabetically. This number is used for many governmental and organizational purposes, including state income tax preparation. From 1930 to 1978, it was also used on Iowa license plates until it was replaced by the full county name.
Finally, the number in the column headed "Map #" is used by the National Atlas of the United States, shown on the left; for purposes of the National Atlas, counties are numbered in geographical order beginning in the NW corner of the map.

|}

Former counties
The following counties no longer exist:

Bancroft (1851–1855), merged with Kossuth County
Cook (1836–1837), merged with Muscatine County
Crocker (1870–1871), merged with Kossuth County
Risley (1851–1853), formed Hamilton County
Yell (1851–1853), formed Webster County

See also

 List of cities in Iowa
 List of townships in Iowa

References

External links
 Iowa: Individual County Chronologies

 
Counties
Iowa, counties in